Hoplojana purpurata is a moth in the  family Eupterotidae. It is found in Sierra Leone.

References

Janinae
Moths described in 1921